James A. Garfield High School is a public high school just outside the limits of Garrettsville, Ohio in Freedom Township.  It is the only high school in the James A. Garfield Local School District.  Their mascot is the G-Men. The name the G-Men came from the investigation by the Federal Government officers nicknamed the G-Men. The investigation was for the $30,000 train robbery of 1935 by Alvin Karpis in Garrettsville.

The school district is named after the 20th President of the United States, James A. Garfield.

Notable alumni
Kathleen Clyde, representative for the Ohio House of Representatives 68th district since 2011
Jeff Richmond, television producer and writer for Saturday Night Live and 30 Rock

Notes and references

External links
 

High schools in Portage County, Ohio
Public high schools in Ohio